Crispijn van de Passe  the Elder, or de Passe (c. 1564, Arnemuiden – buried 6 March 1637, Utrecht) was a Dutch publisher and engraver and founder of a dynasty of engravers comparable to the Wierix family and the Sadelers, though mostly at a more mundane commercial level.  Most of their engravings were portraits, book title-pages, and the like, with relatively few grander narrative subjects.  As with the other dynasties, their style is very similar, and hard to tell apart in the absence of a signature or date, or evidence of location.  Many of the family could produce their own designs, and have left drawings.

Crispijn the Elder
Crispijn van de Passe I was born in Arnemuiden in Zeeland, and trained and worked in Antwerp, then the centre of the printmaking world, with hugely productive workshops producing work for publishers with excellent distribution arrangements throughout Europe.  By 1585 he was a member of the artists' Guild of Saint Luke, and doing work for Christopher Plantin.  Much of this was work engraving the paintings of Maerten de Vos, whose wife's niece Magdalena de Bock Crispijn married.  The disruptions of the Dutch Revolt scattered these artists across Northern Europe; de Passe was an Anabaptist, which made his position especially difficult.  He first moved to Aachen, until Protestants were also expelled from there.  He started his own engraving and publishing business in Cologne in 1589, but again was forced to leave in 1611. He set up in business in Utrecht, by about 1612, where he created engravings for the English and other markets, and where he died in 1637. His works include a famous rendition of the English Gunpowder Plotters, although it is not known what basis he had for the likenesses.

The family's prints are not rare and are well represented in most print rooms, and the National Portrait Gallery in London.

The second generation
Four of Crispijn I's children were also notable engravers for the family business, as was his grandson Crispijn III.  His eldest son, Simon de Passe (c. 1595 – 6 May 1647) worked in England from about 1616 before moving to Copenhagen as royal engraver and designer of medals in 1624, where he remained until his death. He is best remembered for his early London print of Pocahontas (1616). Crispijn II (ca. 1597–1670) worked in Paris, at least from 1617 to 1627, in Utrecht (1630–1639), and from then until his death in Amsterdam; his work on the "Maneige royal" ("Instructions to the king on how to ride a horse") of Antoine de Pluvinel is considered by Hind the finest work of the dynasty.  Willem de Passe (ca. 1598 – ca. 1637), the least productive of the siblings, took over from his brother in England, probably after working in France, and died in London, perhaps of plague.  He joined the Huguenot church in Threadneedle Street in 1624, and his wife Elizabeth may have been the daughter of the English publisher Thomas Jenner. Magdalena van de Passe (1600–1638) was, like her siblings, born in Cologne and died in Utrecht.  She specialized in landscapes until her marriage to the minor artist Frederick van Bevervoorden in 1634, after which she essentially stopped engraving, even though her husband died in 1636.  The business presumably involved shipping drawings, engraved printing plates, and printed copies around Europe between the various cities involved.  After the three deaths in the period 1637–38 only Crispijn II in the Netherlands and Simon in Denmark remained, and Crispijn II's later years were unsuccessful. Crispijn III was a more minor figure who died in 1678.

Major works
Hortus Floridus, mostly by Crispijn II.
Heroologia Anglica, 1620. Sixty-five portraits of English notables, by various members of the family

Notes

References
Hind Arthur M.; A History of Engraving and Etching, Houghton Mifflin Co. 1923 (in USA), reprinted Dover Publications, 1963 
Getty Foundation, Union List of Artists' Names online
Mayor, Hyatt A., Prints and People, Metropolitan Museum of Art/Princeton, 1971,

External links

British Library online database has 1838 items by or after the family
Spamula feature 
Another biography

Dutch engravers
Artist families
Botanical illustrators
1636 births